María Zahara Gordillo Campos (born 10 September 1983), better known simply as Zahara, is a Spanish singer-songwriter.

Biography and education
Zahara wrote her first song when she was fifteen years old, "Una Palabra" (One Word). Zahara attended the Colegio Público Sebastián de Córdoba, and she studied her music at the Conservatorio de Música in Ubeda. She spent half a semester at the Instituto Francisco. For her tertiary education, she studied in, and graduated from, the Magisterio Musical between Almería and Granada.

Discography

Studio albums 

 Día 913 (Day 913) (2005)
 La Fabulosa Historia De...   (The Fabulous History Of...) (2009)
 La Pareja Tóxica (The Toxic Couple) (2011)
 Santa (Saint) (2015)
 Astronauta (Astronaut) (2018)
 Alienígena (Alien) (2019)
 Puta (Whore) (2021)

Singles 

 Merezco (I Deserve) (2009)
 Con Las Ganas (Left Wanting) (2010)
 Lucha De Gigantes (Fight of Giants) with Love of Lesbian  (2010)
 Pregúntale Al Polvo (Ask The Dust) (2011)
 Leñador y La Mujer América (Lumberjack And The American Woman) (2011)
 El Lugar Donde Viene a Morir El Amor (The Place Where Love Comes To Die) (2012)
 Crash (2015)
 El Frío (The cold) (2015)
 Hoy La Bestia Cena en Casa (2018) 
 Guerra Fría (2018) 
 El Fango (2018) 
 MARICHANE (2021) 
 canción de muerte y salvación (2021) 
 TAYLOR (2021) 
 berlin U5 (2021) 
 DOLORES (2021)

References

External links 
 Zahara - Official Website, in Spanish.

1983 births
Living people
Spanish singer-songwriters
Singers from Andalusia
People from Úbeda
21st-century Spanish singers
21st-century Spanish women singers